Zərqava or Zarqava may refer to:
 Zərqava, Agsu, Azerbaijan
 Zərqava, Quba, Azerbaijan